Mulanje is a district in the Southern Region of Malawi. The capital is Mulanje. The district covers an area of 2,056 km.² and has a population of 428,322. It is also known for its tea growing industry and Mount Mulanje which is one of the highest peaks in Southern Africa.

Demographics
At the time of the 2018 Census of Malawi, the distribution of the population of Mulanje District by ethnic group was as follows:
 82.8% Lomwe
 11.0% Mang'anja
 3.8% Yao
 0.7% Chewa
 0.6% Ngoni
 0.4% Sena
 0.3% Nyanja
 0.2% Tumbuka
 0.1% Tonga
 0.0% Nkhonde
 0.0% Lambya
 0.0% Sukwa
 0.3% Others

Government and administrative divisions

There are nine National Assembly constituencies in Mulanje:

 Mulanje - Bale
 Mulanje - Central
 Mulanje - Limbuli
 Mulanje - North
 Mulanje - Pasani
 Mulanje - South
 Mulanje - South East
 Mulanje - South West
 Mulanje - West

Since the 2009 election all of these constituencies have been held by members of the Democratic Progressive Party.

References

 
Districts of Malawi
Districts in Southern Region, Malawi